Lal Thanhawla (born 19 May 1938 or 1942) is an Indian politician and former Chief Minister of Mizoram, belonging to the Indian National Congress party. He holds the record for longest-serving Chief Minister of Mizoram, occupying the position for five terms: 1984 to 1986, 1989 to 1993, 1993 to 1998, 2008 to 2013, and 2013 to 2018. He served as President of the Mizoram Pradesh Congress Committee from 1973 to 2021. His electoral constituencies were Serchhip and Hrangturzo from where he successfully contested the Mizoram Legislative Assembly elections nine times, in 1978, 1979, 1984, 1987, 1989, 1993, 2003, 2008, and 2013.

Early life

Lal Thanhawla is the son of Hmartawnphunga Sailo and Lalsawmliani Chawngthu. He completed matriculation in 1958. He passed his intermediate examination (higher secondary) in arts in 1961. Thereafter, he studied BA at Pachhunga University College (then Aijal College), which was then affiliated to Gauhati University. He graduated in 1964.

Career

Lal Thanhawla started his career as Recorder in the office of Inspector of Schools under the Mizoram District Council, which was in turn under the Government of Assam. After that, he joined the Assam Co-operative Apex Bank as Assistant. In 1966, he joined the underground movement called Mizo National Front (MNF) as Foreign Secretary. He was captured and imprisoned at Silchar jail. After his release in 1967 he joined the Indian National Congress (INC) party. He was immediately appointed to the Chief Organiser of the Aizawl District Congress Committee. In 1973 he was elected President of the Mizoram Pradesh Congress Committee (MPCC), a branch of the Indian National Congress, and continued to win the presidency in every election till date. In 1978 and 1979 he was elected as a Legislator in Union Territory Elections.

In 1984, under his leadership, the Congress party swept the Union Territory and Thanhawla became the Chief Minister. In 1986, when the Mizoram Peace Accord was signed between India and MNF, he stepped down from his office to make way for Laldenga, the leader of MNF, to become the Chief Minister. This was part of the negotiation and settlement of the accord, and he was designated Deputy Chief Minister. Then Mizoram was declared a full state of India. In the first Mizoram Legislative Assembly election held in 1987, he was elected and after Laldenga was toppled through defections, became the Chief Minister in 1988. He continued the office after being re-elected in the 1989 and 1993 elections. In 1998 he lost the election. He eventually reclaimed in the 2003 elections.

In the 2013 Mizoram Assembly Elections, Thanhawla led the ruling Congress party to a victory winning 34 seats in the 40-member legislative assembly, two seats more than in the 2008 election. The major opposition party Mizo National Front (MNF) barely won five seats, while Mizoram People's Conference (MPC) won just one seat. In the 2018 Mizoram Assembly Elections, he lost the election for the second time.

In November 2021, Thanhawla announced his voluntary retirement from party leadership, saying to The Indian Express: "Politics is in my blood and I can never shrug it off. But I do think it is high time that I make way for someone younger. I am a grand old man now." President of INC, Sonia Gandhi formally accepted his resignation on 4 December. The next day, Gandhi appointed him as a member of the Congress Working Committee, and Lalsawta as the new President of MPCC.

Other activities

Lal Thanhawla is actively involved in sports and voluntary services. Among his major contributions are as
 Founder President of Mizoram Football Association
 Founder President of Mizoram Sports Association
 Founder President of Mizoram Hockey Association
 Founder Secretary of Mizoram Boxing Association
 Founder Secretary of Aijal Amateur Athletic Club
 Founder President of Mizoram Olympic Association
 Former President of Indian Olympic Association
 Chairman of North East Olympic Commission
 Founder President of Mizoram Journalists Association
 Founder editor of Mizo Aw (a daily newspaper) and Remna Palai (INC party daily news)
 Founder of Young Mizo Association at Zarkawt
 Founder Secretary of Aizawl Dramatic & Cultural Society

In addition he had served as Secretary of Central Information Forum; Chairman of Literacy Committee, National Development Council of India; Member of the 9th Finance Commission of India; and Member of the Shillong Club Ltd. and Country Club of India.

Award and recognition

 National Citizen Award in 1994 
 Mother Teresa Lifetime Achievement Award in 2009
 Lalthanhawla Higher Secondary School, established in 2011 at Serchhip was named in his honor
 Lifetime Achievement Award from the Evangelical Fellowship of India (EFI) in 2014.
 A sport complex at Pitarte Tlang, Republic Vengthlang, Aizawl, was inaugurated in 2012 as Hawla Indoor Stadium.
 A public hall at Treasury Square, Aizawl, was inaugurated in 2015 as "Lal Thanhawla Auditorium".
 Doctor of Divinity (honoris causa) by Serampore College in 2019.

Allegations

Graft case 
In 1995, officials of the Income Tax Department investigated a case of tax evasion by the Baid group, which operated a travel agency Capital Travels (Capital Tours (India) Pvt. Ltd.), in northeast India. On 13 September, they found a link of swindling government funds between Jodhraj Baid, head of the Baid group operating in Mizoram, Lal Thanhawla, the Chief Minister, and Santosh Mohan Dev, the Union Minister. Based on this evidence, two social workers, Zairema and Bualhranga filed a public interest litigation to the Supreme Court of India in 1996. The case file accused Thanhawla with Baid and Pushpa Sharma, an accountant of Baid, of corruption arising from disproportionate income and assets. Investigation was carried out by the anti-corruption wing of the Mizoram police from 1998, and P. Singthanga, Special Judge of the Prevention of Corruption Act, was appointed as the prosecutor. On 25 April 2003, a chargesheet was submitted by John Neihlaia, Commandant of the First Battalion of the Mizoram Armed Police, upon which the court ordered for an arrest. But Thanhawla had already obtained anticipatory bail in the previous December, so evaded jail. Baid and Sharma were detained in jail for a day until they got the bail. The first trial held in August 2003 found evidence of corruption.

In June 2006, Jodhraj Baid submitted a petition to Gauhati High Court on the incompetency of Singthanga, and subsequently to the Supreme Court, both of which dismissed the petitions. Thanhawla appeared before Singthanga in September and was again charge-sheeted. After several court hearings, T. Saikunga, special judge of a District and Sessions Court, dissolved Thanhawla's case on 26 February 2010 on the grounds that "there was no clear evidence" of money laundering.

Declaration case 
When Lal Thanhawla filed candidature for the 2013 Mizoram Legislative Assembly from two constituencies, Serchhip and Champhai South, in which he failed to declare an immovable property. As his Chief Minister term was closing in 2018, his nomination papers were re-examined by Lalhriatrenga Chhangte, Deputy Controller of Mines at Indian Bureau of Mines in Kolkata, who knew that Thanhawla owns a plot of land in Kolkata, which did not appear in the property declaration. By then Thanhawla had been constructing a building in that land. Chhangte submitted corruption charges of Thanhawla under Section 125 A of the Representation of the People Act, 1951, on 17 January 2018 to the Chief Judicial Magistrate of Serchhip District. The accusation also included inconsistent date of birth declared by Thanhawla in the election papers. Thanhawla made excuses and did not appear before the court in the first two summons in March and April 2018, as his counsel Remsanga Nghaka reported "personal problems." Chhangte also filed a case to the Anti-Corruption Bureau (ACB) of Mizoram Police on 20 May 2018. The Vigilance Department, which was under Thanhawla, failed to issue permission for investigation. 

On his first appearance before the court on 26 May, the Chief Judicial Magistrate Lalngaihmawia Zote acquitted Thanhawla of the age issue as the period of verification for election had lapsed. On the case of land ownership, he claimed that it was allotted to him by the Bengal government as a gift when the Kolkota New Town was expanded in 2011, and that ownership deeds were still officially uncertain in 2013 due to legal issues in that area. He then evaded several court summons under various excuses. The next year on 3 October 2019, he appeared before the court which gave a him a benefit of doubt for the ownership procedures and dismissed the case on account of lack of "evidence of mens rea." The court however declared that he was the legal owner of the land.

References

External link

|-

|-

|-

Further reading

External links
 Biodata of Shri Lal Thanhawla 
 Lalthanhawla Profile from E-Mizoram

People from Aizawl
Indian National Congress politicians from Mizoram
1942 births
Living people
Mizo people
Chief Ministers of Mizoram
Gauhati University alumni
People from Aizawl district
People from Serchhip
Chief ministers from Indian National Congress
Mizoram MLAs 2008–2013
Mizoram MLAs 1993–1998
Mizoram MLAs 2003–2008